Zadro is a Croatian surname. Notable people with the surname include:

 Blago Zadro (1944–1991), Croatian soldier
 Paul Zadro (born 1963), Australian martial artist, sport administrator, and promoter
 Vlado Zadro
 Enoch Zadro (Cherso 1876 - Bolzano 1950) Eminent doctor and surgeon. From 1909 to 1947 he was Director of the Maritime Hospice in Rovigno. A street was named after him by the grateful citizenry of Rovigno.

References

Croatian surnames